The incidence of disability in Costa Rica is about 10.5% of the population. The country is a party to the United Nations Convention on the Rights of Persons with Disabilities since 2008.

Demographics
According to the 2011 national census 10.5% of Costa Rican's have a disability, 52% of them are female and 48% male. Visual impairment that cannot be corrected with spectacles or lenses is the most common disability (56%).

Law and policy
Costa Rica signed the UN Convention on the Rights of Persons with Disabilities on 30 March 2007 and ratified the treaty on 1 October 2008. 
Under the Ley de Igualdad de Opportunidades (Law of Equal Opportunities), no person can be discriminated because they're disabled if they are equally capable as another person. This law also promotes that public places and transport should have facilities that enable people with disabilities to access them.

Culture
May 28 is the Día Nacional de la Persona con Discapacidad (National Disabled People Day) to promote respect for disabled people.

Sport

The country first participated in the Paralympic Games at the 1992 Summer Paralympics, missed the 1996 edition, returned in 2000 and has been represented at all Summer Paralympics since then. Costa Rica has never participated in the Winter Paralympics.

Politics
The political party Accessibility without Exclusion (Partido de Acceso Sin Exclusión) has disability rights as a major policy, the party's president and, as of the 2014 general election, only member of the Legislative Assembly is Óscar López.

References